Geoffrey David Thomson (born 21 April 1959) is a former Australian cricketer. He played one first-class match for Western Australia in 1982/83.

References

External links
 
 

1959 births
Living people
Australian cricketers
Cricketers from Perth, Western Australia
Western Australia cricketers